Poompat Iam-samang (born 4 December 1994), professionally known as Up Poompat, is a Thai actor and model. He is best known for his leading role as Gene in Lovely Writer The Series.

Biography 
Poompat Iam-Samang was born in Bangkok, Thailand on 4 December 1994. He studied management communication at the Communication Art Faculty of Chulalongkorn University. He also acted in campus theatre. After graduating, he went to England to attain a master's in International Relations and Diplomacy. Currently, he is pursuing doctorate degree in the Faculty of Political Science at Chulalongkorn University.

Career 
In 2015, Up debuted as an actor in a Thai movie, Gifted, where he played the lead role. Known for his Korean looks, he received multiple offers to model for popular cosmetic brands. In 2016, he went to South Korean reality television program Babel 250 as a regular member.

In 2018, Poompat starred in e-sports drama, GGEZ as Sabi and in same year he appeared as a guest star in highly acclaimed Thai TV series, Girl From Nowhere. 

In 2021, Poompat starred in BL adaption of novel, Lovely Writer: The Series playing the lead role, Gene alongside Kao Noppakao. The series, aired on channel 3 and subsequently on YouTube, gained a lot of popularity.

Other Works 
Poompat is the owner of a YouTube channel called uppoompat, where he posts content related to promotional activities along with vlogs and collaboration with other artists.  

Apart from having an active acting career, Poompat also co-owns an Artist Management company called JustUp Co. Ltd., which was registered in January 2021.

Filmography

Film

Television

Music video appearances

Reality TV

References 

Poompat Iam-samang
Poompat Iam-samang
Poompat Iam-samang
1994 births
Living people